The 1983 Belgian motorcycle Grand Prix was the ninth round of the 1983 Grand Prix motorcycle racing season. It took place on the weekend of 1–3 July 1983 at the Circuit de Spa-Francorchamps.

Classification

500 cc

References

Belgian motorcycle Grand Prix
Belgian
Motorcycle Grand Prix